The Anglo-Soviet Agreement was a formal military alliance that was signed by the United Kingdom and the Soviet Union against Nazi Germany on July 12, 1941, shortly after the beginning of Operation Barbarossa, the German invasion of the Soviet Union. Both powers pledged to assist each other and not to make a separate peace with Germany. The military alliance was to be valid until the end of World War II. The two founding principles of the agreement of a commitment of mutual assistance and renunciation of a separate peace formed the basis of the later Declaration by United Nations.

Background
The Soviet Union and the Third Reich had signed the Molotov–Ribbentrop Pact, a non-aggression pact between the two nations, on 23 August 1939. A secret part of the agreement defined the areas of Eastern Europe that fell into their respective spheres of influence. In September 1939, Germany invaded Poland; the USSR invaded Poland from the east and the new border remained static.

On 22 June 1941 Germany began an attack along the whole length of its border with the USSR from the Baltic states to Ukraine. The Soviet forces were unprepared and the attacks paralysed the Soviet command system and German forces advanced rapidly into Soviet territories.

Agreement 
The agreement was signed on 12 July 1941 by Sir Stafford Cripps, British Ambassador to the Soviet Union and Vyacheslav Molotov, the Soviet People's Commissar of Foreign Affairs, and it did not require ratification.

Text 
The agreement contained two brief clauses:

(1) The two Governments mutually undertake to render each other assistance and support of all kinds in the present war against Hitlerite Germany.

(2) They further undertake that during this war they will neither negotiate nor conclude an armistice or treaty of peace except by mutual agreement.

Subsequent events 
The Arctic convoys from Britain to the Soviet Union began the following month as did the joint Anglo-Soviet invasion of Iran which opened up a supply route to the USSR. Rezā Shāh was removed from power and the new Shah, Crown Prince Mohammad Reza Pahlavi, signed a Tripartite Treaty Alliance with Britain and the Soviet Union in January 1942, to aid in the allied war effort in a non-military way.

The agreement was broadened to include a political alliance by the Anglo-Soviet Treaty of 1942.

Reactions 
According to Lynn Davis, the United States perceived the agreement to mean that the Soviet Union intended to support the postwar re-establishment of independence of Poland, Czechoslovakia and Yugoslavia.

See also 

 Allies of World War II
Anglo-Soviet relations
Anglo-Soviet Trade Agreement (1921)
 Atlantic Charter
 Diplomatic history of World War II
Declaration by United Nations
Declaration of St James's Palace

Notes

References

External links
Agreement Between the United Kingdom and the Union of Soviet Socialist Republics : July 12, 1941 via Avalon Project

World War II treaties
Military alliances involving the Soviet Union
Military alliances involving the United Kingdom
Soviet Union–United Kingdom relations
1941 in the Soviet Union
1941 in the United Kingdom
United Kingdom in World War II
20th-century military alliances
Treaties concluded in 1941
Treaties of the Soviet Union